The Augustine of Hippo bibliography contains a list of works published by fourth-century Christian bishop and theologian Augustine of Hippo.

Augustine was one of the most prolific Latin authors in terms of surviving works, and the list of his works consists of more than one hundred separate titles. They include apologetic works against the heresies of the Arians, Donatists, Manichaeans and Pelagians; texts on Christian doctrine, notably De Doctrina Christiana (On Christian Doctrine); and exegetical works such as commentaries on Book of Genesis, the Psalms and Paul's Letter to the Romans; along with many sermons and letters.

Apart from those, Augustine is probably best known for his Confessions, which is a personal account of his earlier life, and for De civitate dei (The City of God, consisting of 22 books), which he wrote to restore the confidence of his fellow Christians, which was badly shaken by the sack of Rome by the Visigoths in 410. His On the Trinity, in which he developed what has become known as the 'psychological analogy' of the Trinity, is also among his masterpieces. He also wrote On Free Choice Of The Will (De libero arbitrio), addressing why God gives humans free will that can be used for evil.

At the end of his life (c. 426–427) Augustine revisited his previous works in chronological order in the Retractationes. The title of this work is often translated into English as Retractions, which has led some to assume that at the end of his career, Augustine retreated from his earlier theological positions. In fact, the Latin title literally means "re-treatments" and though in this work Augustine suggested what he would have said differently, it provides little in the way of actual "retraction." It does, however, give the reader a rare picture of the development of a writer and his final thoughts.

Works

The chronology of Augustine's work is in many cases uncertain, and scholarly estimates of dates may differ.

References

External links
 On Marriage and Concupiscence (De nuptiis et concupiscientia) available at New Advent
 On the literal meaning of Genesis - unfinished work (De genesi ad litteram opus imperfectum) - English translation
 On the divination of demons (De divinatione daemonorum )
 Stanford Encyclopedia of Philosophy: Saint Augustine, English translations
Digitized manuscripts of Augustine of Hippo at Somni.

Bibliographies by writer
Augustine of Hippo
Augustine studies